Jeann Beattie (May 21, 1922 – September 17, 2005) was a Canadian novelist and journalist. She was most noted for her 1950 novel Blaze of Noon, which won that year's Ryerson Fiction Award.

Biography
Originally from St. Catharines, Ontario, Beattie began her career working as a clerical staffer for the St. Catharines Standard in 1940, before leaving in 1944 to study journalism at Columbia University. She was a writer for various Canadian newspapers and magazines, including Maclean's, and a television producer for CBC Television. She was particularly known for her advocacy journalism for fairer treatment of young people in the juvenile detention system, reflected in her 1971 non-fiction book And the Tiger Leaps.

In addition to Blaze of Noon, she published the novel Behold the Hour in 1959. That novel was a roman à clef set within the CBC.

Following her retirement from journalism, Beattie returned to St. Catharines, where she conducted writing workshops for the St. Catharines Library. She died on September 17, 2005, at age 83 from surgery complications.

References

1922 births
2005 deaths
20th-century Canadian novelists
Canadian women novelists
Canadian women journalists
Canadian newspaper journalists
Canadian magazine journalists
Canadian television producers
Canadian women television producers
Journalists from Ontario
People from St. Catharines
Writers from Ontario
Columbia University alumni
Maclean's writers and editors
Canadian women non-fiction writers
20th-century Canadian women writers
Canadian women columnists